Cyril Dunne (born 1941 in Ballinasloe, County Galway) is an Irish former Gaelic footballer who played for his local club St Grellan's GFC and at senior level for the Galway county team in the 1960s, when he won three consecutive All-Ireland Senior Football Championship medals in 1964, 1965 and 1966. Dunne later served as manager of the Galway team between 1984 and 1986.

His father John "Tull" Dunne was on the winning Galway teams in the 1934 and 1938 All-Ireland finals, coach of the winning teams in 1964, 1965 and 1066 and secretary of the Galway County Board from 1938 to 1981.

References

 

1941 births
Living people
Ballinasloe Gaelic footballers
Connacht inter-provincial Gaelic footballers
Gaelic football managers
Galway inter-county Gaelic footballers
St Grellan's Gaelic footballers